Souad Dibi is a Moroccan feminist activist, president of the association El Khir (in English : charity) based in Essaouira, and whose object is to provide economic independence to women by promoting their professional integration.
Each year more than one hundred women follow an education program designed to provide them with the skills in a domain generating revenues (cooking, care, room service). This region of the Moroccan Atlantic coast is a tourist area, but also demonstrates for young people and women a poverty rate of 30% (National Initiative for human development).

Biography
Souad Dibi was born in El Jadida, near Casablanca, and married a carpenter from the Moroccan coast. She was a seamstress before setting up her association. Dibi founded El Khir in 1998 for the Essaouira women abandoned and without any resources for living.

She was invited to the SIGEF (Social Innovation and Global Ethics Forum) organized by Horyou in 2015 in Geneva. An interim agency, MS INTERIM puts women who benefited from the associative qualifying courses in touch with professionals looking for skilled employees. In March 2015 for the International Women's Day she published Un art qui fait vivre, a book of Moroccan cooking created within the association, telling the story of a group of women who managed to change their lives thanks to their mastering of culinary skills.

References

Living people
Moroccan feminists
People from Essaouira
Year of birth missing (living people)